Donald G. Kelly is an American politician, lawyer, political commentator and horsebreeder from the state of Louisiana.

He served in the Louisiana State Senate from 1976 to 1996, representing the 31st district.

References 

20th-century American lawyers
20th-century American politicians
American political commentators
Date of birth missing (living people)
Living people
Louisiana lawyers
Louisiana state senators